Elise Mertens and Demi Schuurs were the defending champions, but chose not to participate together. Schuurs teamed up with Anna-Lena Grönefeld, but lost in the semifinals to Mertens and Aryna Sabalenka.

Duan Yingying and Veronika Kudermetova won the title, defeating Mertens and Sabalenka in the final, 7–6(7–3), 6–2.

Seeds
The top four seeds received a bye into the second round.

Draw

Finals

Top half

Bottom half

References

External links
 Main draw

Doubles